Hjalmer J. "Jolly" Erickson (January 7, 1906 – February 6, 1959) was an American football and basketball coach. He served as the head football coach at Bemidji State Teachers College in Bemidji, Minnesota from 1938 to 1954, compiling a record of 54–54–5. He was also the school's head basketball coach from 1944 to 1946, tallying a mark of 23–6.

Head coaching record

Football

References

External links
 

1906 births
1959 deaths
Bemidji State Beavers football coaches
Bemidji State Beavers men's basketball coaches
People from Moorhead, Minnesota
Basketball coaches from Minnesota
Coaches of American football from Minnesota